Steve Argyle is an artist whose work has appeared in role-playing games.

Career
Steve Argyle's Dungeons & Dragons work includes books such as Complete Champion (2007), the 4th edition Dungeon Master's Guide (2008) and Monster Manual (2008), Primal Power (2009), Player's Handbook 2 (2009), and Dungeon Master's Guide 2 (2009).

Argyle is also known for his work on the Magic: The Gathering collectible card game. He is also known for his work on Legend of the Five Rings.

Argyle was one of the artists to appear at the first-ever Salt Lake Comic Con in September 2013.

References

External links

 Steve Argyle's home page

Living people
Place of birth missing (living people)
Role-playing game artists
Year of birth missing (living people)